Košarkaški klub Mega Basket, commonly referred to as KK Mega Basket or as Mega MIS due to sponsorship reasons, is a men's professional basketball club based in Belgrade, Serbia. The club is a founding member and shareholder of the Adriatic Basketball Association.

In addition to Belgrade, the club also played its home games in Kruševac (2012–13 season), Smederevo (2013–14 season), and Sremska Mitrovica (2014–2019). The club participates in the KLS and the ABA League.

History

The Avala Ada era (1998–2005) 
KK Avala Ada was established on 23 December 1998 by a group of basketball enthusiasts, all employed at the Avala Ada packaging factory located in the Viline Vode neighbourhood on the outskirts of Belgrade. Though implemented in late 1998, the idea of launching a full-fledged basketball club within the state-owned factory's legal framework had been present since summer 1995 on the heels of yet another participation of Avala Ada employees in basketball competitions at the Workers' Sporting Games (Radničke sportske igre; state-funded excursionary social, leisure, and team building gatherings featuring semi-formal sporting competitions for employees within various industries). Even before 1995, Avala Ada employees had participated regularly at the Workers' Sporting Games, continually placing high against basketball select squads of other factories/companies within the packaging industry in FR Yugoslavia and even prior in SFR Yugoslavia. Though the idea of launching a more formal and permanent basketball program within the factory had been bandied around since 1995, the immediate catalyst for its late 1998 formation turned out to be the factory basketball team's notable showing at the 1998 Workers' Sporting Games in Divčibare several months earlier during summer 1998. Furthermore, having already secured a steady revenue and regular customer base allowed the company to financially support such a venture outside of its regular business activity. Within months, Košarkaški klub Avala Ada (Avala Ada Basketball Club) was established as a legal entity within the Avala Ada sports society that was formed simultaneously.

With KK Avala Ada's club management appointed from the factory employee ranks—club president Veljko Grujić and sporting director Velimir Mihailović—coaching hires were made from outside the factory: young head coach Miodrag "Miša" Perišić and his assistant Rade Orlović. Players on the roster were also a mix of factory's employees and outside acquisitions: the team's first captain was the factory's commercial director Bratislav Gajić.

The newly-established club started out in the lowest rank of the FR Yugoslavia basketball system: Belgrade Municipal League, the so-called "Concrete League" (Beton liga), fifth tier of competition in the country. In the early summer of 1999, the club won the Belgrade Municipal League (played outdoors only during summer), thus qualifying for the Serbian Second League (4th-tier competition on the FR Yugoslavia basketball pyramid). Playing the 1999–2000 season in the fourth-tier Serbian Second League, the Perišić-coached club set an ambitious goal of gaining promotion on its first try and succeeded.

The 2000–01 season was played in the third-tier Serbian First League, finishing third and barely missing out on promotion. Head coach Miša Perišić left the club after eventful two and a half years, taking the offer from the Serbian First League rivals KK Nova Pazova. The following 2001–02 season, Avala Ada finished third again, failing to gain promotion to the higher rank. 

In the 2002–03 season, with Miša Perišić returning to the club as head coach, the club again missed promotion based on the league standing, however, it managed to qualify to the federal First B League through playoffs in Novi Bečej, beating Vrbas and KK Zeta.

Playing its first season, 2003–04, in the country-wide federal rank in the second-tier First B League (Serbian group), Avala Ada finished third thus missing promotion to the top league. Also, in 2003, Avala Ada packaging factory (founded in 1946) was privatized after 57 years of public ownership. Its new private owner Nebojša Šaranović was entirely not keen on continuing the financial support of a basketball club within his newly-acquired packaging factory asset and thus set about carving KK Avala Ada out of the factory's structure with the intention of selling it.

Before the start of the 2004–05 season, the most significant development in club's short history occurred—it was taken over by the Miško Ražnatović-owned BeoBasket sports agency.

The Mega Basket era (2005–present) 
Based on its performance in the 2004–05 season, Avala Ada managed to gain promotion to the Serbia-Montenegro top-tier league. During the 2005–06 campaign, playing its very first top flight season, the club changed its name to KK Mega Basket on 19 December 2005. At the same time, it signed a sponsorship deal with the Smederevo-based Ishrana food company, leading to the club competing as Mega Ishrana until 2007. The team got relegated at the end of the 2005–06 season, however, the May 2006 Montenegrin independence referendum that meant that Montenegro would become a fully independent state also resulted in the basketball league being re-organized and Mega Ishrana remaining in Serbia's top-tier basketball league.

Later, also via a naming-rights sponsorship deal, the club was called Mega Aqua Monta for the 2007–08 season, and Mega Hypo Leasing in the 2008–09 season.

In August 2009, before the start of the 2009–10 season, another Belgrade-based club KK Vizura merged into KK Mega Hypo Leasing, and the club was renamed KK Mega Vizura. In November 2014, the club changed its name to Mega Leks due to sponsorship reasons. In 2016, Mega Leks won its first trophy ever when it beat KK Partizan 86–80 in the Serbian Cup Final. In 2017, the club changed its name to Mega Bemax due to sponsorship reasons.

On June 14, 2018, the club signed a contract on sports and technical cooperation with OKK Beograd. Later that summer, on August 11, 2018, the club played a pre-season preparation game under NCAA basketball rules against the most recent NCAA tournament Southern Regional semifinalist University of Kentucky men's basketball team at the Imperial Arena on Paradise Island in the Bahamas, losing heavily 100–64. Some ten days later, on August 23, 2018, Mega played the University of Michigan men's basketball team, recent NCAA tournament runner-up, this time under FIBA rules, in Sant Julià de Vilatorta, Spain and winning 81–73.

As an organization focused primarily on showcasing its roster and providing a springboard platform for player transfers to bigger clubs in Europe and the NBA, in summer 2019, Mega continued the pre-season practice of travelling to the Bahamas to face off against top U.S. collegiate teams in preparatory games. This time, it was two games against the Texas Tech University basketball team, most recently the NCAA tournament runner-up; Texas Tech won the first contest 94–92 on August 16, 2019 at Imperial Arena on Paradise Island while Mega won 73–76 four days later at the Kendal Isaacs Gymnasium.

On September 15, 2020, the club changed its name to Mega Soccerbet for the 2020–21 season due to sponsorship reasons. On October 28, 2021, the club changed its name to Mega Mozzart for the 2021–22 season due to sponsorship reasons. In July 2022, the club changed its name to Mega MIS for the 2022–23 season due to sponsorship reasons.

Sponsorship naming
The club has had several denominations through the years due to its sponsorship:
 Mega Ishrana (2005–2007)
 Mega Aqua Monta (2007–2008)
 Mega Hypo Leasing (2008–2009)
 Mega Vizura (2009–2014)
 Mega Leks (2014–2017)
 Mega Bemax (2017–2020)
 Mega Soccerbet (2020–2021)
 Mega Mozzart (2021–2022)
 Mega MIS (2022–present)

Home arenas

Mega Basket plays their ABA League domestic home games at the Ranko Žeravica Sports Hall, located in the Belgrade municipality of New Belgrade. The arena, then named New Belgrade Sports Hall, was built in 1968. It has a seating capacity of 5,000. Mega Basket plays their BLS home matches at the Mega Factory Hall. 

The club has had several home arenas through the years in four cities: 
 Šumice Hall, Belgrade (2008–2009)
 Vizura Sports Center, Belgrade (2009–2012)
 Kruševac Hall, Kruševac (2012–2013)
 Smederevo Hall, Smederevo (2013–2014)
 Pinki Hall, Sremska Mitrovica (2014–2019)
 Mega Factory Hall, Belgrade (2017–present)
 Ranko Žeravica Hall, Belgrade (2014–2015, 2019–present)

Players

Current roster

Depth chart

Players at the NBA draft

Coaches 

 Avala Ada
  Miodrag Perišić (1999–2001)
  Miodrag Perišić (2002–2004)
  Boško Đokić (2005)
  Miodrag Kadija (2005)
  Oliver Popović (2005)
 Mega Basket 
  Vlade Đurović (2005–2006)
  Oliver Popović (2006–2007)
  Mihailo Uvalin (2007)
  Dragiša Šarić (2007)
  Aleksandar Kesar (2007–2008)
  Mihailo Uvalin (2008–2009)
  Miodrag Rajković (2009–2010)
  Vlada Vukoičić (2010–2012)
  Dejan Milojević (2012–2020)
  Vlada Jovanović (2020–2022)
  Marko Barać (2022–present)

Season-by-season

Trophies and awards

Trophies 
Serbian League
Runners-up (1): 2020–21
Serbian Cup
Winners  (1): 2016
Runners-up (3): 2014, 2015, 2021
Adriatic League
Runners-up (1): 2015–16
Balkan League
3rd place (1): 2008–09

Individual awards

Serbian First League MVP (1):
  Boban Marjanović – 2013
Serbian Super League MVP (1):
  Boban Marjanović – 2013
Serbian Cup MVP (2):
  Vasilije Micić – 2014
  Nikola Ivanović – 2016

Adriatic League MVP (2):
  Nikola Jokić – 2015
  Filip Petrušev – 2021
Adriatic League Top Scorer (1):
  Filip Petrušev – 2021
Adriatic League Top Prospect (2):
  Filip Petrušev – 2021
  Nikola Jović – 2022

Management and staff 
Current officeholders are:
 President: Vladimir Mihailović
 General manager: Goran Ćakić
 Team manager: Novica Veličković

Current head coaches are:
 Senior team: Marko Barać
 U18 and U19 teams: Dragoljub Avramović
 U16 team: Petar Radonjić

Notable players

  Danilo Anđušić
  Nemanja Dangubić
  Tadija Dragićević
  Stevan Jelovac
  Nikola Jokić
  Nikola Jović
  Marko Kešelj 
  Nemanja Krstić
  Sava Lešić
  Boban Marjanović
  Vasilije Micić
  Dragan Milosavljević
  Dejan Musli
  Ivan Paunić
  Filip Petrušev
  Aleksandar Rašić
  Boriša Simanić
  Jovo Stanojević
  Stefan Stojačić 
  Milenko Tepić
  Novica Veličković 
  Rade Zagorac
  Stefan Glogovac
  Aleksandar Lazić
  Ratko Varda 
  Danko Branković
  Karlo Matković
  Ivica Zubac
  Timothé Luwawu-Cabarrot
  Adam Mokoka
  Goga Bitadze
  Kostja Mushidi
  Vlado Janković 
  Alpha Kaba
  Dylan Ennis
  Nikola Ivanović
  Danilo Nikolić 
  Nikola Peković
  Kendrick Perry
  Petar Popović
  Nemanja Radović 
  Marko Simonović
  Corey Webster
  Aleksander Balcerowski
  Samson Ruzhentsev
  Vlatko Čančar
  Duşan Çantekin

International record

References

External links
 
 Club Profile at aba-liga.com
 Club Profile at eurobasket.com

 
Basketball teams established in 1998
Basketball teams in Belgrade